Stanowice may refer to the following places in Poland:
Stanowice, Góra County in Lower Silesian Voivodeship (south-west Poland)
Stanowice, Oława County in Lower Silesian Voivodeship (south-west Poland)
Stanowice, Świdnica County in Lower Silesian Voivodeship (south-west Poland)
Stanowice, Silesian Voivodeship (south Poland)
Stanowice, Lubusz Voivodeship (west Poland)